Marko Đalović (born 19 May 1986) is a Serbian professional footballer who plays as a defender for Zemun.

Club career
After coming through the youth system of Red Star Belgrade, Đalović made his senior debut at Srem in 2004. He was transferred to newly promoted Serbian SuperLiga club Bežanija in 2006.

Between 2009 and 2014, Đalović played abroad in the Czech Republic, Russia, and Kazakhstan. He briefly returned to his homeland to play for Novi Pazar in 2015, before rejoining Kazakh club Zhetysu in 2016.

International career
Đalović represented Serbia and Montenegro at the 2005 UEFA European Under-19 Championship.

References

External links

 
 
 

1986 births
Living people
Sportspeople from Kragujevac
Serbia and Montenegro footballers
Serbian footballers
Association football defenders
FK Srem players
FK Bežanija players
FK Vojvodina players
FK Mladá Boleslav players
FC Baltika Kaliningrad players
FC Zhetysu players
FK Novi Pazar players
FK Zemun players
Serbian First League players
Serbian SuperLiga players
Russian First League players
Czech First League players
Kazakhstan Premier League players
Serbian expatriate footballers
Expatriate footballers in the Czech Republic
Expatriate footballers in Russia
Expatriate footballers in Kazakhstan
Serbian expatriate sportspeople in the Czech Republic
Serbian expatriate sportspeople in Russia
Serbian expatriate sportspeople in Kazakhstan